The Erfahrungsfeld zur Entfaltung der Sinne (English: Field of experiences for the development of the senses) is an interactive exhibition that stimulates all the senses, designed by Hugo Kükelhaus. The different exhibits are intended to inspire the visitor to experiment with them, to explore them, like in a park of the senses or a science center. Kükelhaus constructed 32 pieces of playground equipment for schools in the city of Dortmund and demonstrated some of these equipment at the Expo 67 world exhibition in Montreal. His holistic concept for a large open-air exhibition was shown in the exhibition Phenomena, shown in Rotterdam, South Africa, and Bietigheim, among others.

Concept

In accordance with the Kükelhaus concept, a large number of sensory objects, fields of experience and systems were created that are intended to address different but also combined sensory areas, for example:

Hearing: drums, monochord, organ pipes, wind harp, singing bowl, Chladnian sound plates, humming stone, gongs, wind chimes/chimes, but also the sounds of nature in gardens: birds chirping, splashing and rustling water, the hum of bees.

Seeing: afterimages, color spinning tops, rotating disks, tilting perspective, marble cascade, prisms, play of light and color, natural garden with a play of colors of different flowers, Feng Shui garden, butterfly garden, water features, idyllic oases of calm, dry stone walls, natural objects such as natural stones and rocks, roots, campfire, water features with a Leonard table.

Smell: herb snail or types of herbs, rose path or rosarium, fragrances of flowers.

Feeling/touching: touch gallery or touch wall or touch boxes, barefoot path as a haptic path with stone, sand, gravel, bark mulch, moss, grass, moor or water; experiment with glockenspiel in water, water features.

Taste: orchards with fruit to taste, picnic by the campfire, orange meditation.

Movement: Swashplate, three-time pendulum, sand pendulum, pendulum stone, balancing devices such as bars, disks, pirouette, climbing objects such as trees, roots, rocks.

Encounters: communicative facilities such as partner swings, echo tubes, parabolic dishes, also encounters with animals such as in the petting zoo, animals in orchards.

Locations

There are fields of experience at Schloss Freudenberg in Wiesbaden as well as in Essen, Kassel, Nuremberg, Suhl, Welzheim near Stuttgart, in the park of Wissem Castle in Troisdorf near Bonn and the Path of the Senses in Haag am Hausruck (Austria). A traveling exhibition World of the Senses addresses the field of experience. The Bremervörde nature and adventure park was created on the occasion of the second Lower Saxony state exhibition Nature in Urban Development in 1991, the Park of the Senses in Laatzen for the EXPO 2000 in Hanover. Further sensory experience facilities exist inGroß Gerungs, Rodenbach, Herten and many other places. The tower of the senses in Nuremberg is a related example of an interactive experimental museum for making scientific fundamentals tangible, within the framework of museum education and in the children's museum area, which offers objects to try out on the topic: "How do our senses actually work?"

Literature 
 Hugo Kükelhaus: Entfaltung der Sinne, Verlag Schloss Freudenberg, Neuauflage 2008 
 Elisabeth Stelkens: Auf den Spuren des Erfahrungsfeldes, Organismus und Technik e.V., Essen 2007
 Hugo Kükelhaus: Fassen Fühlen Bilden – Organerfahrungen im Umgang mit Phänomenen, Gemeinnützige Forschungs- und Bildungsgesellschaft mbH Eigenverlag; 7. Aufl. 2000, 
 Walter Jäger: Das da draußen sind wir… Bausteine einer Pädagogik der Sinne. 7 Jahre unterwegs mit dem Mobilen Erfahrungsfeld zur Entfaltung der Sinne, Nürnberg, Verlag Modernes Lernen, Dortmund 1997,

References

Dortmund